Stonemyia tranquilla is a species of fly in the family Tabanidae.

Distribution
United States.

References

Tabanidae
Insects described in 1875
Diptera of North America
Taxa named by Carl Robert Osten-Sacken